Sergey Anatolyevich Sosnovski ( (Syarhey Sasnowski); ; born 14 August 1981) is a Belarusian football coach and former player (defender).

Club career
Sosnovski was born in Minsk and signed his first professional contract with local club Traktor Minsk. He played an important role in BATE Borisov's 2008–09 Champions League campaign, heading in a goal against Bulgarian Levski Sofia to open the scoring for FC BATE in the return leg of the third qualifying round played on 27 August 2008. The match ended in a 1–1 draw and the team from Barysaw became the first Belarusian club to reach the group stages of the Champions League. On 27 August 2009, Sosnovski scored two goals in a 4–0 win against Litex Lovech, which helped BATE to qualify for the group stage of the UEFA Europa League.
In February 2011, Sosnovski ended his stint with BATE and signed a contract with Russian side FC Tom Tomsk.

International career
He made his international debut for Belarus on 1 April 2009, playing the full 90 minutes in a World Cup qualifier against Kazakhstan.

Honours
MTZ-RIPO Minsk
Belarusian Cup winner: 2004–05

BATE Borisov
Belarusian Premier League champion: 2008, 2009, 2010
Belarusian Cup winner: 2009–10
Belarusian Super Cup winner: 2010

Minsk
Belarusian Cup winner: 2012–13

References

External links
 
 
 

1981 births
Living people
Footballers from Minsk
Belarusian footballers
Association football defenders
Belarus international footballers
FC BATE Borisov players
FC Partizan Minsk players
FC Neman Grodno players
Belarusian expatriate footballers
Expatriate footballers in Russia
Russian Premier League players
FC Tom Tomsk players
FC Energetik-BGU Minsk players
FC Minsk players
FC Torpedo-BelAZ Zhodino players
FC Traktor Minsk players
Belarusian football managers
FC Minsk managers